Annesley Woodhouse is a village in Nottinghamshire, England, located approximately 10 miles north of the City of Nottingham and 6 miles south of Mansfield, close to Junction 27 of the M1. With a current population of around 3.500, from the 2011 census being included in the civil parish of Annesley.

History 
Annesley Woodhouse originated as a farming community and expanded in the 19th and 20th centuries as the mining industry locally was established and grew. In the post-war years and beyond, the village has grown rapidly and conjoined with neighbouring villages Nuncargate & Kirkby Woodhouse. All have now become an extension of their 'parent' town, Kirkby-in-Ashfield.

Modern Annesley Woodhouse 
With the demise of the mining industry in the 1990s Annesley Woodhouse is now largely a residential area with people travelling out of the village for education, employment and leisure.

A windmill was located near to Midfield Road.

External links

Villages in Nottinghamshire
Ashfield District